Fawley Tunnel is a  diameter,  long tunnel under Southampton Water between Fawley Power Station and Chilling near Warsash. It was constructed between 1962 and 1965 to carry two 400 kV circuits as part of the National Grid. The tunnel was built with a 3 feet 1.125 inch gauge railway to help with maintenance access. The railway was operated with a single battery powered locomotive that was scrapped in the late 70s.

See also 
 Fawley Power Station

References 

Tunnels in Hampshire
Buildings and structures in Hampshire
National Grid (Great Britain)
Electric power infrastructure in England
Electric power transmission in the United Kingdom
Tunnels completed in 1965